Rastislav Dej (born September 12, 1988) is a Slovak professional ice hockey player currently playing for HC Vítkovice in the Czech Extraliga.

Dej has previously played for HC Karlovy Vary, Motor České Budějovice and Mountfield HK.

References

External links

1988 births
Living people
HC Karlovy Vary players
HC Most players
Motor České Budějovice players
Piráti Chomutov players
Slovak ice hockey forwards
Stadion Hradec Králové players
Sportspeople from Považská Bystrica
Slovak expatriate ice hockey players in the Czech Republic